The 1912 Syracuse Orangemen football team represented Syracuse University during the 1912 NCAA football season. The head coach was C. DeForest Cummings, coaching his second season with the Orangemen. The team played their home games at Archbold Stadium in Syracuse, New York.

Schedule

Source:

References

Syracuse
Syracuse Orange football seasons
Syracuse Orangemen football